The Ronald Reagan Turnpike, often abbreviated RR TPK may refer to:

 Homestead Extension of Florida's Turnpike (unsigned Florida State Road 821), a toll road running from Florida City to Miramar.
 Florida's Turnpike mainline (unsigned Florida State Road 91), officially designated as the Ronald Reagan Turnpike along with the Homestead Extension, but this designation is rarely used.